Shelton School District is located in the Pacific Northwest in the city of Shelton, Washington.  It is the largest public school district in Mason County, Washington.   The district provides services for over 4000 students in a K to 12 program.  It has three K-4 elementary schools, one 5-6 middle school, one 7-8 junior high school, one 9-12 high school and an alternative high school.
 
Shelton School District is unique in that they have four feeder school districts.  These feeder school districts do not have all grade levels in their school district.  Students from Hood Canal, Pioneer and Southside all attend Shelton High School.  Students from Grapeview have a choice of going to either Shetlon or North Mason school districts.

Schools

Bordeaux Elementary,
Grades K-5
Principal: Carey Murray
350 E. University Ave
Shelton, Washington 98584
(360) 426-3253
September 2015 Enrolled Students: 547

Evergreen Elementary,
Grades K-5, All Classrooms Bilingual
Principal: Adina Brito
900 W. Franklin Street 
Shelton, Washington 98584
(360) 426-8281
September 2015 Enrolled Students: 529
 
 
Mt. View Elementary,
Grades K-5
Principal: Jorge Nelson
534 East K
Shelton, Washington 98584
(360) 426-8564
September 2015 Enrolled Students: 600

Olympic Middle School,
Grades 6-7
Principal: Eric Barkman
800 East K Street
Shelton, Washington 98584
(360) 462-6671
September 2015  Enrolled Students: 553
 
Oakland Bay Jr. High,
Grades 8-9
Principal: Gina Franchini
3301 North Shelton Springs Road
Shelton, Washington 98584
(360) 426-7991
September 2015 Enrolled Students: 671

CHOICE Alternative Schools, 
Grades K-12
Principal: Stacey Anderson
807 West Pine Street
Shelton, Washington 98584
(360) 426-7664
September 2015 Enrolled Students: 168

Shelton High School,
Grades 10-12
Principal: Jennifer Deyette
3737 North Shelton Springs Road
Shelton, Washington 98584
(360) 426-4471
September 2015 Enrolled Students: 1067

Link
SSD Official Site
OSPI School District Report Card

School districts in Washington (state)
Education in Mason County, Washington
Shelton, Washington